is a passenger railway station located in the city of Kōnan, Kōchi Prefecture, Japan. It is operated by the third-sector Tosa Kuroshio Railway with the station number "GN34".

Lines
Only local trains stop at the station.

Layout
The station consists of a side platform serving a single elevated track. There is no station building but an enclosed shelter is provided on the platform for waiting passengers. Access to the platform is by means of a flight of steps. a bike shed is provided underneath the elevated structure.

Adjacent stations

Station mascot
Each station on the Asa Line features a cartoon mascot character designed by Takashi Yanase, a local cartoonist from Kōchi Prefecture. The mascot for Kagami Station is an figure with a mandarin orange for a head named . The design is chosen because  (Yamakita mandarin oranges)  are a specialty product of the area.

History

Passenger statistics
In fiscal 2011, the station was used by an average of 96 passengers daily.

Surrounding area
Konan City Kagami Government Building (formerly Kagami Town Hall)
Japan National Route 55

See also 
List of railway stations in Japan

References

External links

Railway stations in Kōchi Prefecture
Railway stations in Japan opened in 2002
Kōnan, Kōchi